Moriah Rose Pereira (born January 1, 1995), known professionally as Poppy and formerly as That Poppy, is an American singer, songwriter, YouTuber, and performance artist. In 2014, she gained viral fame by starring in surreal performance art videos on YouTube as an uncanny valley-like android who commented on and satirised internet culture and modern society. She signed a recording contract with Island Records in 2015 and released her debut pop EP Bubblebath in 2016.

In 2017, Poppy signed a deal with Mad Decent and released her debut studio album Poppy.Computer, which consisted of art pop and bubblegum pop songs. To promote the album, she embarked on the Poppy.Computer Tour. In 2018, she released the pilot for the proposed surreal comedy online series I'm Poppy on YouTube Premium. She also released her second studio album Am I a Girl? In stark contrast to her previous style, the second half of Am I a Girl? began to show a heavy nu metal influence.

In 2020, Poppy signed to Sumerian Records and released her third studio album I Disagree, incorporating heavy metal and industrial rock. Continuing the stylistic shift that started with her second album, I Disagree featured lyrical themes and music videos which some critics described as "disturbing", "violent", and "macabre". In 2021, as part of her long-time collaboration with professional wrestling promotion WWE and its NXT brand, she released the metalcore EP Eat (NXT Soundtrack). Her fourth studio album, Flux, was released three months later to critical acclaim and featured a less harsh and more stripped-down sound than her previous works.

Poppy's song "Bloodmoney" received a nomination for the Grammy Award for Best Metal Performance in 2021.

Early life
Moriah Rose Pereira was born in Boston, Massachusetts, on January 1, 1995.  She moved with her family to Nashville, Tennessee at age 14. She recalls wanting to be a Rockette as a child, and took dance lessons for 11 years until deciding to be a musician. She was bullied at school for being skinny and quiet, leading her to complete the latter half of her studies via homeschooling. She moved to Los Angeles at the age of 18.

Career

2011–2014: Moriah Poppy and ThatPoppyTV
Poppy had her first performance at IndieCove in August 2011, where she covered an Alanis Morissette song. She made two YouTube channels: "Moriah Poppy", which has been deleted, and "Poppy", her current channel. Prior to 2014, she performed at social media festivals, including VidCon in June 2012 and DigiTour in June 2013.

2015–2016: YouTube partnership, Bubblebath, and 3:36 (Music to Sleep To)
Poppy moved to Los Angeles in 2013 to pursue her musical career. There she teamed up with director Corey Michael Mixter, known by his stage name Titanic Sinclair, to make a series of abstract promotional videos on a YouTube channel originally titled "thatPoppyTV". Though her partnership with Sinclair dissolved in 2019, as of April 2022, the channel is actively uploading videos and has attracted a large audience. In 2015, she signed to Island Records under the name That Poppy and released her debut song, "Everybody Wants to Be Poppy", in June of that year. She performed at the Corona Capital Festival in November 2015. She released the song, "Lowlife", a month after releasing her first single "Everybody Wants to Be Poppy" and released her first EP, a four-track pop record called Bubblebath, on Island in 2016. The EP consists of four songs; "Lowlife", "Money", "Altar", and "American Kids". In August 2016, she released a series of advertisements for the shoe company Steve Madden on her channel as a part of its Steve Madden Music program.

On October 17, 2016, Poppy released an ambient music album called 3:36 (Music to Sleep To), composed by Titanic Sinclair and herself, with assistance from polysomnographists from the Washington University School of Medicine.

In November 2016, she became the face of Japanese retailer Sanrio's first "Hello Sanrio" collection.

2017–2018: Poppy.Computer, Poppy.Church, and Am I a Girl?

In February 2017, Poppy starred in a series of videos for Comedy Central called "Internet Famous with Poppy". That September, they won a Streamy award in the category 'Breakthrough Artist'.

Poppy's debut studio album, Poppy.Computer, was released on October 6, 2017, by Mad Decent. Her first concert tour, the Poppy.Computer Tour, started on October 19, 2017, in Vancouver. In November, Poppy announced that their second studio album was "almost ready", and that they were going to Japan again to finish it.

Poppy made her YouTube Rewind debut in 2017, and was one of the few content creators to get their own lines. In March 2018, Poppy performed at the Japanese pop music festival, Popspring.

On April 17, 2018, Sinclair's former partner Mars Argo filed a 44-page lawsuit in Central California court against Sinclair and Poppy alleging copyright infringement, stating that Sinclair based Poppy's online persona on theirs, as well as emotional and physical abuse Sinclair had allegedly subjected them to in the period after their separation and the subsequent abandonment of the project. On May 7, Poppy made a public statement about the "frivolous" lawsuit, saying Argo was attempting to manipulate them psychologically. They called the suit a "publicity campaign" and a "desperate grab for fame". The Sinclair case was settled out of court on September 14 "with no money exchanging hands". The copyright case against Poppy was dismissed.

In 2018, Poppy released a cover of Gary Numan's song "Metal" as a single on all digital platforms. On July 27, 2018, she released the first single for the album Am I a Girl? titled "In a Minute". She released the album's second single "Time Is Up", which features American DJ Diplo, on August 22, 2018. She released "Fashion After All" on October 12, 2018. "Hard Feelings" was released on October 19 and "X" was released on October 25, 2018. The album also featured the song "Play Destroy", a collaboration with Canadian singer Grimes. Shortly after the release of the album, Poppy revealed that Grimes bullied her during the making of "Play Destroy" stating:

In 2018, Poppy began to drop hints about a new project and website called Poppy.Church. The website is no longer active. Poppy attended the 2018 American Music Awards. After winning the Breakthrough Artist in 2017, Poppy returned to the Streamy Awards in 2018 as a presenter. Her cover of "Metal" was featured in the video game WWE 2K20.

2019–2020: Choke, Genesis 1, I Disagree, and Poppy's Inferno
On January 8, 2019, Poppy announced a graphic novel through Z2 Comics entitled Genesis 1, which was released to comic book stores on July 10. The graphic novel tells the origin of Poppy. The description on Z2 Comics' website reads "Is she a girl? Is she a machine? Is she humanity's redemption, or its damnation? Don't be scared – either way, she is Poppy… and you love Poppy. Witness the genesis of the internet phenomenon in this original graphic novel, bundled with an exclusive brand new album." It was co-written by Poppy, Sinclair and Ryan Cady, with art by Masa Minoura and Ian McGinty. She elaborated in an interview with Gigwise that the album released with the graphic novel, titled I C U: Music to Read To, is an ambient music album meant to be listened to while reading.

On January 23, 2019, Billboard announced Poppy would star in the augmented-reality experience A Jester's Tale created and directed by Asad J. Malik. It was produced by RYOT and 1RIC, premiering at the Sundance Film Festival as part of the New Frontier program. The storyline "transports viewers inside a child's bedroom to meet a cast of character holograms". After attending the iHeartRadio awards in 2016, she returned in 2019 wearing a dress designed by Viktor & Rolf, and sat front row at their fashion show. In 2019, Poppy revealed plans for a movie and her own music streaming service. She attended the Billboard Music Awards. Her song "Scary Mask" was released on May 29, and featured American rock band Fever 333. The song was included on her second EP, Choke, which was on released on June 28, 2019.

The title track was released as the second single from the album (following "Concrete" in August) on October 4 alongside the album pre-order. The album continues the metal sound featured on her 2019 EP Choke and the latter half of Am I a Girl? "Bloodmoney" was released as the third single from the album on November 6, 2019, and "Fill the Crown" was released as the fourth single from the album on December 11, 2019. The final single from the album, "Anything Like Me", was released alongside the album and the music video for the track on January 10, 2020. I Disagree was released on January 10, 2020, through Sumerian Records.

A statement confirming that Poppy and Sinclair parted ways was released in December 2019. She accused him of glamorizing suicide and using this to manipulate her. Responding to the fan speculations that some of her videos were "secret cries for help", Poppy noted that while it was not intentional, the videos projected a facet of reality and "people online sensed it a lot sooner than I did". Poppy has never publicly retracted her initial statements regarding Mars Argo's accusations and insists she was "never controlled" by Mixter. On January 28, 2020, Poppy announced her second graphic novel, titled Poppy's Inferno, illustrated by Zoe Thorogood and Amilcar Pinna and co-written by Ryan Cady. After numerous delays due to the COVID-19 pandemic, it was published on October 20 alongside a soundtrack album, Music to Scream To. On June 3, 2020, Poppy released a cover of the 2002 t.A.T.u. hit, "All the Things She Said". Shortly after, the song "Khaos x4" was released, along with the announcement of the deluxe version of I Disagree, titled I Disagree (more), later released on August 14, 2020. On December 1, 2020, Sumerian released her Christmas EP, A Very Poppy Christmas.

2020–2022: Eat, Flux, and Stagger
On December 29, 2020, Poppy announced that she had been working on the follow-up album to I Disagree, and said it will have "a completely different sonic vibe" to its predecessor.

On March 14, 2021, Poppy's song "Bloodmoney" earned a Grammy nomination for Best Metal Performance, making her the first solo female artist to be nominated in the category. She also performed a new song titled "Eat". On April 21, 2021, her song "Say Cheese" was made the official theme song for professional wrestling show WWE NXT, following her performance at the aforementioned event on April 9, 2021. Both "Eat" and "Say Cheese" were included on her fourth EP, a surprise release titled Eat (NXT Soundtrack). On June 30, 2021, she released a new song titled "Her" as the first single from her fourth studio album Flux. On July 29, 2021, she announced that Flux would be released on September 24, 2021 and released the title track as the second single from the album. On August 25, 2021, she released "So Mean" as the third single from Flux with an accompanying music video. On September 24, 2021, she released the rest of the studio album.

Poppy and Sumerian Records teamed up with Roblox for its first-ever listening party upon release of the album, streaming Flux on the gaming platform. Music from the album was integrated throughout nine Roblox games, starting on September 24 and ending on September 26, 2021.

On January 11, 2022, Poppy released a new song titled "3.14". She also announced the Never Find My Place Tour, which started on March 8 in Sacramento, California, and ended on November 30 in Glasgow.

On August 27, 2022, Poppy premiered a new song at the Reading Festival called "FYB", an acronym for "Fuck You Back". On the same day, she announced her EP Stagger, which was released on October 14, 2022. The song "FYB" was released as the EP's lead single on September 23, 2022. It was also announced that the Stagger EP would be her debut on Republic and Lava Records. A music video for the title track was released on the same day as the EP's release.

2022–present: Fifth studio album
In December 2022, Poppy confirmed that she is working on her fifth studio album, sharing a snippet of a new song called Church Outfit via Instagram.

YouTube

Poppy's YouTube channel was created on October 6, 2011, under the name ThatPoppyTV, alongside another channel, Moriah Poppy, and posted covers and vlogs, but in 2014, all of these videos were deleted, alongside the Moriah Poppy Channel. A few months later, her earliest currently public video (an abstract skit called Poppy Eats Cotton Candy, directed by Titanic Sinclair) was uploaded on November 4, 2014, The videos are described by their producer Sinclair as "a combination of Andy Warhol's pop accessibility, David Lynch's creepiness, and Tim Burton's zany comedic tone". The channel has been discussed by other YouTubers, including PewDiePie, Social Repose, Night Mind, the Film Theorists, Reaction Time, and the Fine Brothers on their React series. She starred in an episode in which she reacts to children reacting to her videos. She has also appeared in an episode of the web series Good Mythical Morning.

Sinclair alluded in an interview that Poppy's character in the promotional videos presented itself to him as an android and how some of the concept relates to the uncanny valley hypothesis. Poppy has stated that her YouTube videos tell a story. Aside from her abstract promotional videos, Poppy's channel features her original music, various covers, and acoustic versions of her songs.

Poppy's friend Charlotte, a celebrity-interviewing mannequin with a synthetic voice, is a recurring character. She usually appears interacting with Poppy but also on her own. She appears to have developed a drug and jealousy problem after Poppy became famous, which strains their relationship, although Charlotte became Poppy's opening act for her 2017–2018 Poppy.Computer Tour. Other characters include Charlotte's son, a boy mannequin who has taken the brunt of abuse at the hands of his mother during a drugged stupor; Plant (voiced by Sinclair), a potted basil plant who is one of Poppy's closest friends and biggest supporter; and Skeleton (also voiced by Sinclair), a plastic model skeleton who is revealed as Charlotte's drug dealer.

The channel also has an animated promotional miniseries called Everybody Wants to Be Poppy, directed by Titanic Sinclair and illustrated by Melanie Foreman, which stars Poppy as herself, Titanic Sinclair as Rex, actor Matt Bennett as Pho, Canadian singer-songwriter Simon Wilcox as Phoebe, and Los Angeles-based photographer Sam McGuire as Wyatt. The series documents Poppy and Rex's journey as they attempt to find a "magical kale shake".

I'm Poppy, a short film and the first episode of a proposed television series of the same name written and directed by Titanic Sinclair, premiered at the 2018 Sundance Film Festival. In it, Poppy leaves the Internet for the real world and confronts the pitfalls of fame, including cults, deranged fans, Satan, and her bitter rival Charlotte.

Artistry
Poppy's musical style has been described as pop, heavy metal, rock, electronic, industrial, and experimental. More specifically, her music has covered various other genres including electropop, bubblegum pop, nu metal, pop-metal, dance-pop,  art pop, experimental pop, synth-pop, avant-garde pop, dream pop, pop rock, hard rock, noise, ambient, metalcore, alternative pop, alternative rock, pop punk, industrial metal, and industrial rock.

Poppy has been compared to artists such as Grimes, Icona Pop, Melanie Martinez, and Charli XCX. Poppy has described herself as a "kawaii Barbie child". She has described her music style as "music [that] makes you want to rule the world." Poppy states that she drew inspiration from genres such as J-pop and K-pop, as well as reggae. She recalls beginning to write music in 2012. She told Tiger Beat her musical inspirations are Cyndi Lauper, unicorns and Elvis Presley. She is a fan of Jimmy Eat World, No Doubt, Norma Jean, Blondie, Gary Numan, Of Montreal, and Madonna.

Public persona

Overview
Poppy has said that her stage name originated as a nickname given to her by a friend. A natural brunette, she has dyed her hair many colors, usually to match the aesthetic of each of her albums' respective eras.

In April 2017, Poppy began selling a book on her website for called The Gospel of Poppy, described as "a book of wisdom".

Poppy's identity was initially kept guarded. She explained in 2016, "I don't want people to talk about how old I am; I want them to talk about what I'm making. [...] People, especially nowadays, are so obsessed with knowing everything. They'll have to invest their time in finding it." In 2018, she tweeted that she had kept her identity guarded due to being a survivor of past abuse.

Reception
Critics have both praised the catchiness of Poppy's music and described her persona as distant from reality. Racked called her "sweet, but alien" and "brightly addictive". In a review of I Disagree, Neil Z. Yeung of AllMusic called it "a metallic storm, informed by pulsing beats, thrashing riffs, and crushing breakdowns. That fury is punctuated by atmospheric electronics and sugary vocals that support her deceptively confrontational lyrics." David Mogendorff, who works in artist content and services for YouTube and Google Play Music, said she has "a strong J- and K-pop influence".

Poppy's YouTube channel is often regarded as a commentary on social media. Vice described the tone of the channel, saying, "If you have the patience to work your way through all the videos on this channel, certain trends start to emerge. The most obvious is Poppy's fixation with the internet and social media culture, which she claims to love. But far more interesting is the general tone of the videos, which have gotten progressively darker over the last two years." Gita Jackson of Kotaku suggested the videos are a commentary on the experience of being online, writing, "In a way, she's made every YouTube video, ever. Her channel is an index of every insincere apology, desperate bid for views and assurance that they couldn't do it without her fans you'll ever see. That Poppy is not only skewering the absurdity of people who make a living as public figures on the internet—she has it out for the entire experience of being online." Mogendorff said the videos are "like social commentary... touch[ing] on the anxieties of modern life" and "a really interesting way of communicating, personal but strange".

V magazine listed Poppy as part of the new generation of music, saying that "her hatched-from-an-egg, Glinda the Good Witch vibes have inspired labels from 'human ASMR' to a one-woman 'digital rabbit hole', none of which seem to stick". Paper magazine also listed Poppy as one of the 100 women revolutionizing pop music, noting that "no matter what Poppy does, we can learn to expect the unexpected". Alternative Press cited Poppy in their list of 20 artists who defined the sound of nu-metal.

Personal life
Poppy's potential gender questioning was one of the main themes of Am I a Girl?. In a 2019 interview, she stated that she identified as a woman and that she believes "everyone should be able to identify with whatever they choose".

In October 2019, Poppy began dating rapper Ghostemane. In July 2020, she announced on social media that the two were engaged. The couple separated and called off their engagement in late 2021.

In April 2020, Poppy began to post stylized make-up tutorials on her YouTube channel. She tweeted to explain, "My ex-boyfriend would always tell me I looked ugly without make-up on, and I should never been seen without it." She also claimed that the same ex-boyfriend was leaking her unreleased videos, photographs of her without make-up, and "very personal demos that only he has" such as a cover of the Pokémon theme song. In response to the alleged leak, she posted the cover of the Pokémon theme song herself.

Poppy shares a friendship with singer Marilyn Manson.

Filmography

Films

Television

Web

Discography

Studio albums
 Poppy.Computer (2017)
 Am I a Girl? (2018)
 I Disagree (2020)
 Flux (2021)

Bibliography
 The Gospel of Poppy (2017)
 Genesis 1 (2019)
 Poppy's Inferno (2020)
 Tit Tat  (2023)

Tours
Headlining
 Bubblebath Tour (2016)
 Poppy.Computer Tour (2017–2018) 
 Am I a Girl? Tour (2018–2019)
 I Disagree Tour (2020)
 Never Find My Place Tour (2022)

Co-headlining
 Threesome Tour (2019; with Bring Me the Horizon and Sleeping with Sirens)

Supporting
 Smashing Pumpkins - Spirits on Fire Tour (2022)

Awards and nominations

Notes

References

External links

 
 
 Business Insider article, December 5, 2017

 
1995 births
21st-century American singers
21st-century American women singers
Ambient composers
Ambient musicians
American women rock singers
American women pop singers
American YouTubers
Electropop musicians
Music YouTubers
Island Records artists
Living people
Mad Decent artists
Sumerian Records artists
American women in electronic music
American women heavy metal singers
American women singer-songwriters
Nu metal singers
Kawaii metal musicians
Hispanic and Latino American singers
Hispanic and Latino American musicians
Hispanic and Latino American actresses
Shorty Award winners
Art pop musicians
American singer-songwriters